Raja Club Athletic (Arabic: نادي الرجاء الرياضي, romanized: Nādī ar-Rajāʾ ar-Riyāḍī) commonly referred to as Raja CA, is a professional sports club based in Casablanca, Morocco.

This chronological list comprises all the 65 managers who have held this position in the first team of Raja CA throughout its history since their foundation on 20 March 1949. Each manager's entry includes his dates of tenure and the significant achievements accomplished under his care. Caretaker managers are included, where known, as well as those who have been in permanent charge.

History 
Being one of the founders of Raja CA, Mohamed Naoui was player-manager between 1949 and 1954, and is to date the only one to have held this position. The first coach was Abdelkader Jalal who led Raja between 1954 and 1956. In September 1956, Kacem Kacemi qualified with the team to the first edition of Botola, after three victories in the play-offs. Raja was the first team to do so since their qualifying match was played at 8:30 am on 7 October 1956.

The club's longest-serving manager was Père Jégo, he managed the team three times during 11 years (1957-1965, 1965-1967 and 1968–1969). The most successful manager of the club's history is Oscar Fulloné with six trophies, five won between 1998 and 2000, and one between in 2006.

Père Jégo, Alexandru Moldovan, M'hamed Fakhir and José Romão are the only ones to have coached the team during three spells or more (excluding temporary spells). Mohamed Tibari gained Raja's first trophy in 1974, while Fernando Cabrita earned their first Botola in 1988. Raja then won its first Champions League with Rabah Saâdane in 1989, his second with Vahid Halilhodžić in 1997 and secured his third star with Oscar Fullone in 1999.

Head coaches

.
This is a complete list of all the managers in the history of Raja CA since 1949.
 Table headers

 Nationality – If the manager played international football as a player, the country/countries he played for are shown. Otherwise, the manager's nationality is given as their country of birth.
 From – The year of the manager's first game for Raja CA.
 To – The year of the manager's last game for Raja CA.
 Honours – The trophies won while managing Raja CA.

 Key

 p = Player-manager
 [C] = Caretaker manager

By nationality

Trophies

References

External links
 

Managers
Managers
Raja CA managers
Lists of association football managers by club